Lorena Clare Facio  (born June 30, 1943) is the former First Lady of Costa Rica and wife of former President Miguel Ángel Rodríguez Echeverría.

Biography 
She was born in San José, Costa Rica on June 30, 1943 to her parents Manuel Emilio Clare and María Elena Facio. She is the only daughter and has three brothers. She concluded her secondary school education in Colegio Nuestra Señora de Sión and left for France for a few years. After returning to Costa Rica she began bilingual studies at Lincoln School.

She is known to be a skilled sportswoman and represented Costa Rica in dressage at the 1983 Pan American Games.

She married Miguel Ángel Rodríguez on December 14, 1962 although she had met him as a teenager at a party in Barrio Aranjuez. They had three children: Miguel Alberto, Andrés and Ana Elena.

During her time as First Lady she supported projects in benefit of older people and cancer patients, and was president of the Martín House of the Youth. She was part of the Social Christian Unity Party Planning Office.

She was Costa Rica's last First Lady of the 20th century.

References

1943 births
Living people
First ladies and gentlemen of Costa Rica
Equestrians at the 1983 Pan American Games
Pan American Games competitors for Costa Rica
Costa Rican dressage riders
Social Christian Unity Party politicians
Sportspeople from San José, Costa Rica
Costa Rican female equestrians